In chemistry, a phosphide is a compound containing the  ion or its equivalent.  Many different phosphides are known, with widely differing structures.  Most commonly encountered on the binary phosphides, i.e. those materials consisting only of phosphorus and a less electronegative element.  Numerous are polyphosphides, which are solids consisting of anionic chains or clusters of phosphorus.  Phosphides are known with the majority of less electronegative elements with the exception of Hg, Pb, Sb, Bi, Te, and Po.  Finally, some phosphides are molecular.

Binary phosphides
Binary phosphides include phosphorus and one other element. An example of a group 1 phosphide is sodium phosphide. Other notable examples include aluminium phosphide and calcium phosphide, which are used as pesticides, exploiting their tendency to release toxic phosphine upon hydrolysis. Magnesium phosphide also is moisture sensitive. Indium phosphide and gallium phosphide  are used as a semi-conductors, often in combination of related arsenides.  Copper phosphide illustrates a rare stoichiometry for a phosphide.  These species are insoluble in all solvents - they are 3-dimensional solid state polymers.  For those with electropositive metals, the materials hydrolyze:

Polyphosphides
Polyphosphides contain  bonds. The simplest polyphosphides contain  ions;. Others contain the cluster  ions and polymeric chain anions (e.g. the helical  ion) and complex sheet or 3-D anions. The range of structures is extensive. Eight mono- and polyphosphides of nickel also exist:.

Preparation of phosphide and polyphosphide materials
There are many ways to prepare phosphide compounds. One common way involves heating a metal and red phosphorus (P) under inert atmospheric conditions or vacuum. In principle, all metal phosphides and polyphosphides can be synthesized from elemental phosphorus and the respective metal element in stoichiometric forms. However, the synthesis is complicated due to several problems. The exothermic reactions are often explosive due to local overheating. Oxidized metals, or even just an oxidized layer on the exterior of the metal, causes extreme and unacceptably high temperatures for beginning phosphorination.

Metal phosphides are also produced by reaction of tris(trimethylsilyl)phosphine with metal halides.  In this method, the halide is liberated as the volatile trimethylsilyl chloride.

Molecular phosphides
Compounds with triple bonds between a metal and phosphorus are rare.  The main examples have the formula , where R is a bulky organic substituent.

Organic phosphides

Many organophosphides are known.  Common examples have the formula  where R is an organic substituent and M is a metal.  One example is lithium diphenylphosphide. The Zintl cluster  is obtained with diverse alkali metal derivatives.

Natural examples
The mineral schreibersite  is common in some meteorites.

References

Anions

Phosphorus(−III) compounds